Squatting in Peru is the occupation of unused or derelict buildings or land without the permission of the owner. From the 1940s onwards, land invasions to create shanty towns first called  and later  have occurred. A Wall of Shame has been built to separate rich and poor areas of the city. During the COVID-19 pandemic in Peru, an increase in the occupation of UNESCO World Heritage Sites such as Caral and the Nazca Lines was reported.

History 

Squatting in Peru follows the trajectory of other Latin American cities, in that factors such as internal migration to urban areas, lack of affordable housing and ineffective governance have resulted in large informal settlements. Peruvian law states that squatters on publicly owned land cannot be evicted if they have stayed there for over 24 hours. Instead they can apply for legal title to the courts and if the land has not been developed over the previous decade, they are likely to win the case. In the countryside, many haciendas (large farms) were squatted in the 1950s by mestizo peasants and most occupations were tolerated.

From the 1940s onwards, groups of families made land invasions to acquire homes and were often evicted forcibly, until government policy changed to toleration. These mostly squatted settlements known as barriadas made up 4% of new homes in 1940 and nearly 70% in 1985. The rapid growth of the capital Lima is shown by estimates of the squatter population being 5,000 in 1942, 130,000 in 1958, 338,00 in 1962 and 500,000 in 1966. Most  are however assisted by the city authorities which try to provide infrastructure; others arise spontaneously as squats and a smaller proportion are built on land bought by cooperatives. The term  refers to the separate phenomenon of urban slum tenements, although residents prefer the official term . Around 25% of Lima's population lives in these dilapidated tenement blocks.

From the 1980s onwards, a wall was built in Lima to separate rich settlements such as La Molina and Santiago de Surco from  such as San Juan de Miraflores and Villa María del Triunfo. It became known as the Wall of Shame (Muro de la Vergüenza) and by 2019 was ten kilometres long. The wall means that people who work service jobs in affluent areas must commute for several hours to work. The informal settlement Villa El Salvador was squatted in 1971 and quickly grew to have a population of 25,000. By 2008, its population was 350,000 and many squatters had title to their land, although all expansion of the site continues to be illegal. The United Front of the Peoples of Peru (FUPP, Frente Unitario de los Pueblos del Perú) represents inhabitants of informal settlements and has its headquarters at Villa El Salvador.

As part of the internal conflict in Peru, the Shining Path have used squatting as a tactic to gain support. On 28 July 1990 (Peruvian Independence Day), the Shining Path led an occupation in Ate-Vitarte, a district of Lima. The site was then named Raucana after Félix Raucana, one of two people who died in clashes with the police. A planned eviction in 1991 was called off after the Shining Path bombed a factory belonging to the owner.

During the COVID-19 pandemic, a national lockdown was announced. Squatters took advantage of the lessened security presence to move onto an archaeological investigation at Caral, an ancient city developed between 3,000 and 1,800 BC, which was made a UNESCO World Heritage Site in 2009. The occupiers planted trees and beans, and after being asked to leave sent death threats to archaeologist Ruth Shady. Squatters also encroached on another heritage site, the Nazca Lines. Officials from the Ministry of Culture alleged that the shacks constructed by squatters had destroyed an ancient cemetery.

References

Further reading 
 

Peru
Shining Path
History of Lima